HMC may stand for:

Education 

 Harvey Mudd College, Claremont, California, US
 Headmasters' and Headmistresses' Conference, UK organisation of independent fee-charging schools
 Harvard Model Congress, congressional simulation conference
 Harris Manchester College, Oxford, a constituent college of the University of Oxford

Companies 

 Hamad Medical Corporation, Qatar
 Harvard Management Company,  manages Harvard University endowment
 Heerema Marine Contractors, The Netherlands
 Holyoke Machine Company, defunct, United States
 Honda Motor Company, of Japan, NYSE symbol
 Hornady Manufacturing Company (cartridge headstamp)
 Hyundai Motor Company, of Republic Of Korea

Other 
 Chief Hospital corpsman, a United States Navy rate
 Half Mini Card, a physical specification of the PCI Express Mini Card
 Hamamatsuchō Station, JR East station code
 Hardware Management Console, a computer technology provided by IBM
 His/Her Majesty's Cutter, UK Customs ship prefix since 2005
 Herzliya Medical Center,  Herzliya, Israel
 Holocaust Memorial Center
 Holyoke Medical Center
 Hybrid Memory Cube, a computer memory (RAM) technology
 Royal Commission on Historical Manuscripts, or Historical Manuscripts Commission
 Hampton Court railway station, the terminus of the Hampton Court Branch Line in Surrey, SW of London
 Hamiltonian Monte Carlo